Thalía Mallqui is a Peruvian freestyle wrestler. She is a two-time medalist at the Pan American Games.

She won one of the bronze medals in the women's 48kg event at the 2014 Pan American Wrestling Championships held in Mexico City, Mexico.

She won the silver medal in the 48 kg event at the 2015 Pan American Games held in Toronto, Canada. Four years later, in 2019, she won one of the bronze medals in the 50 kg event at the Pan American Games held in Lima, Peru.

At the 2017 Pan American Wrestling Championships held in Lauro de Freitas, Brazil, she won the silver medal in the 48 kg event.

In March 2020, she competed at the Pan American Olympic Qualification Tournament held in Ottawa, Canada hoping to qualify for the 2020 Summer Olympics in Tokyo, Japan. She finished in 3rd place. She also failed to qualify for the Olympics at the World Olympic Qualification Tournament held in Sofia, Bulgaria.

She won the bronze medal in her event at the 2022 Bolivarian Games held in Valledupar, Colombia. She won the silver medal in her event at the 2022 South American Games held in Asunción, Paraguay.

References

External links 
 

Living people
Year of birth missing (living people)
Place of birth missing (living people)
Peruvian female sport wrestlers
Pan American Games medalists in wrestling
Pan American Games silver medalists for Peru
Pan American Games bronze medalists for Peru
Medalists at the 2015 Pan American Games
Medalists at the 2019 Pan American Games
Wrestlers at the 2015 Pan American Games
Wrestlers at the 2019 Pan American Games
Pan American Wrestling Championships medalists
South American Games silver medalists for Peru
South American Games medalists in wrestling
Competitors at the 2018 South American Games
Competitors at the 2022 South American Games
20th-century Peruvian women
21st-century Peruvian women